Tina McGee is a fictional character appearing in The Flash comic book series published by DC Comics.  She first appeared in The Flash (vol. 2) #3. Tina McGee is a nutritionist and researcher for STAR Labs.

Tina McGee made her live action debut in the 1990 television series The Flash as part of the main cast portrayed by Amanda Pays. Pays returned to portray a different version of Tina McGee as a recurring character in The CW television series The Flash.

Fictional character biography

She originally received a grant from Harvard to study Wally West's metabolism. Her husband Jerry McGee did his own speed experiments and turned into the homicidal "Speed Demon". This resulted in a coma. Tina and Flash grew into a romantic relationship despite their age differences and Tina was legally still married at the time; she moves in with him. Various stresses, including Wally's domineering mother, break apart their bond.

The Flash loses his speed due to alien influence. Tina leads a research project, based at the Pacific Institute, into restoring it. This causes Wally's speed to drastically increase, leaving a trail of destruction across the country. Tina teams up with her now recovered ex and Flash's older detective friend Mason. While the trio quest to find the addled Wally, Tina and Jerry get back together.

Later, Tina and Jerry unwittingly unleash the robotic intelligence Kilg%re among their own university colleagues. At this point, the entity is non-violent; despite taking over many of the people at the facility, all it wanted was to deeply experience life.

Jerry and Tina become employees at Central City's STAR Labs. They assist Flash multiple times, such as taking care of his injured ally, Cyborg.

Tina later becomes head of the facility. She heads a project to discover what had happened to the speedster-empowering 'Speed Force' with Bart Allen, who was seemingly the only surviving speedster at the time.

Other versions
In a possible future timeline observed by the time traveler Waverider, a super-powered crime lord threatens Tina McGee's life to force her husband Jerry to make anti-Flash weaponry in an attempt to draw a retired Wally West out of the Witness Protection Program. In this alternate future, Tina is still working at S.T.A.R. Labs; her colleague, Chunk, is murdered to force her cooperation.

In other media 

 Tina McGee appears in The Flash (1990), portrayed by Amanda Pays. This version helps Barry Allen control his powers and aids him in his crime-fighting as the Flash. Throughout the show, Barry and Tina appear attracted to each other, but always claim to be "just" friends and partners.
 This series is retroactively established as a parallel universe designated Earth-90 of the Arrowverse in the 2018 crossover special "Elseworlds". In the follow-up crossover, "Crisis on Infinite Earths", Barry of Earth-90 reveals to his Earth-1 counterpart that he and Tina had gotten married sometime after the series ended and she had died before the events of the crossover. He later thinks of her as he sacrifices himself to destroy the Anti-Monitor's anti-matter cannon.
 Tina McGee appears in the Arrowverse series The Flash (2014), portrayed again by Amanda Pays. This version is the director of Mercury Labs, a rival tech firm to S.T.A.R. Labs, a friend of Harrison Wells, and later retroactively established as the Earth-1 counterpart to the Earth-90 version. She and Barry Allen’s father Henry Allen were attracted to each other, but Henry is killed by Zoom before they can act on it.

References

Comics characters introduced in 1987
DC Comics scientists
DC Comics television characters
Fictional Harvard University people
Fictional inventors
Fictional female scientists
Characters created by Mike Baron
Characters created by Jackson Guice
Flash (comics) characters